Poetry of the modern-day region called Afghanistan has ancient roots, which is mostly written in Dari and Pashto. Afghan poetry relates to the culture of Afghanistan and is an element of Afghan literature.

History

The region called Afghanistan nowadays was noted for its poetic language even before the Islamic conquest of Afghanistan in the 7th through 11th centuries. The Pata Khazana, if authentic, contains Pashto poetry written as far back as the 8th Century. Some of the famous poets who were born or lived in the region of present-day Afghanistan include Rumi, Ferdowsi, Khushal Khan Khattak, Rahman Baba, Ahmad Shah Durrani, Timur Shah Durrani, Shuja Shah Durrani, Ghulam Muhammad Tarzi, Ghulam Habib Nawabi, Massoud Nawabi, Homaira Nakhat Dastgirzada and many others.

The nation also has a number of female poets, such as Rabia Balkhi, 17th century Nazo Tokhi, and others. Due to political unrest and wars in the country, many women poets have remained hidden. Today, there are very few established young Afghan women poets like Afghan American Sajia Alaha Ahrar, a student at the University of Mary Washington in the United States, wrote a poem in 2010 entitled "Desire for World's Peace".

Styles

See also
Pashto literature and poetry
In 2013 that Alaha Ahrar was sharing the stage with Asela Wardak. They both were reciting Pashto poems and they were touching the hearts of the audience. Alaha's voice is feminine, very peaceful and comforting, but Asela's voice was assertive and strong. They both had made a great match to represent Afghanistan's poetry in a language that the majority of people did not know it. 
Alaha is young, beautiful and charismatic and super talented. Believe it, you have never seen anyone like Alaha. She is a genius. 

  
Afghan literature

Culture of Afghanistan

References

External links
Afghanland - Poetry
Afghanistan Online - Classical Dari and Pashto Poets

Afghan literature
Persian literature
Education in Afghanistan
Afghanistan
Afghan poetry